Donald Bernard Schwall (born March 2, 1936) is an American former professional baseball player. He played in Major League Baseball as a right-handed pitcher for the Boston Red Sox (1961–62), Pittsburgh Pirates (1963–66) and Atlanta Braves (1966–67).

Baseball career
Schwall was born in Wilkes-Barre, Pennsylvania. He attended Ypsilanti High School and was selected an All-Big Eight basketball star at the University of Oklahoma in 1957. Schwall faced off against NBA Hall of Famer Wilt Chamberlain three times while playing for the Sooners, outscoring him 30-16 in his final showdown against him. Although he completed his coursework, a clerical error caused Schwall to never receive his degree. The oversight went unnoticed for decades until 2018 when at the age of 82, Schwall contacted the University of Oklahoma about it. The University acknowledged the oversight and had Schwall attend that year's graduation, 57 years late.  A year after his graduation, he signed with the Red Sox.

In 1961, Schwall posted a 15–7 record with 91 strikeouts and a 3.22 earned run average, for a Boston team that finished 33 games out of first place and ten games under .500. He won his first six decisions, extended the dazzling first-year stats to 13–2, and won Rookie of the Year honors, beating out Hall of Fame-bound teammate Carl Yastrzemski. At Fenway Park, on July 31, he pitched three innings in the first All-Star Game tie in major league baseball history (1–1), occurred when the game was stopped in the 9th inning due to rain.

After a sub-par 1962 season (9–15), Schwall was sent to Pittsburgh. He and catcher Jim Pagliaroni were traded to the Pirates for first baseman Dick Stuart and pitcher Jack Lamabe. He went 6–12 in 1963, and later switched to a reliever, recording a career-best 2.92 ERA while winning nine games in 1965. The Pirates traded him to the Braves on June 15, 1966 for left-handed pitcher Billy O'Dell. Schwall finished his career with Atlanta early in the next season.

In seven seasons, Schwall compiled a 49–48 record with 408 strikeouts, a 3.72 ERA, 18 complete games, five shutouts, four saves, and 743 innings pitched in 172 games (103 as a starter).

Don Schwall was the second Red Sox player to be named the AL Rookie of the Year, joining Walter Dropo (1950), and later joined by Carlton Fisk (1972), Fred Lynn (1975), Nomar Garciaparra (1997), and Dustin Pedroia (2007).

Post-baseball career
After leaving baseball, Schwall pursued a career as an investment banker.  A friend of Bob Prince, after Prince's death Schwall managed Prince's charitable endeavors for several years.  Schwall continued to pursue his college education after becoming a professional baseball player, but never received his degree.  In early 2018, he contacted the University of Oklahoma and was informed that he had completed his graduation requirements in 1961.  He attended the school's May 2018 graduation ceremonies and received his diploma.

References

External links

2002 interview
Don Schwall at:
Baseball Almanac (MLB players who played for University of Oklahoma)
PSA Collectors Universe (article)

1936 births
Living people
Alpine Cowboys players
Atlanta Braves players
Baseball players from Pennsylvania
Boston Red Sox players
Major League Baseball pitchers
Major League Baseball Rookie of the Year Award winners
Minneapolis Millers (baseball) players
Oklahoma Sooners baseball players
Oklahoma Sooners men's basketball players
Pittsburgh Pirates players
Richmond Braves players
Seattle Rainiers players
Sportspeople from Wilkes-Barre, Pennsylvania
Waterloo Hawks (baseball) players